Aissa Sioudi is a Moroccan professional footballer who plays as a goalkeeper for Wydad AC.

References

1997 births
Living people
Moroccan footballers
Association football goalkeepers
Wydad AC players